2022 Vegalta Sendai season.

Squad 
As of 24 October 2022.

Type 2

Type 2

DSP

DSP

J2 League

League table

Match details 

*In order to prevent coronavirus, the number of visitors will be increased in stages.

References

External links 

  J.League official site

Vegalta Sendai
Vegalta Sendai seasons